The Maroon Bells–Snowmass Wilderness is a U.S. Wilderness Area located in the Elk Mountains of central Colorado. The  wilderness was established in 1980 in the Gunnison and White River national forests. The wilderness is named after the two peaks known as the Maroon Bells, and the Snowmass Mountain.

References

Wilderness areas of Colorado
Protected areas of Pitkin County, Colorado
Protected areas of Gunnison County, Colorado
Protected areas established in 1980
Gunnison National Forest
White River National Forest
1980 establishments in Colorado